State Route 87 (SR 87) is a  north–south highway that travels from I-10 near Picacho northward to State Route 264 near Second Mesa.

Route description

SR 87 begins  to the north of I-10 at a junction with an unsigned orphan segment of SR 84, which serves as a direct connection to I-10 at Exit 211. SR 87 travels north for  toward Coolidge, passing by the town of Eloy. In Coolidge, State Route 87 is known as Arizona Boulevard.

The highway leaves Coolidge heading northwest and travels as a two-lane rural road through the Gila River Indian Community, until it reaches a junction with SR 587 on the border between the Gila River Indian Community and Chandler. North of this junction, SR 87 travels along Arizona Avenue in Chandler, intersecting Loop 202 before entering Mesa and becoming Country Club Drive. The highway then intersects with U.S. 60 and SR 202 for a second time, before leaving Mesa as the Beeline Highway. The Mesa and Chandler sections of SR 87 are discontinuous, with most of these sections between McKellips Road in Mesa and Cloud Road in Chandler being owned and maintained by their respective cities. A  ADOT-owned segment north of the Western Canal and south of Baseline Road forms the city limits separating Mesa from Chandler, and also the city limits separating Gilbert from Mesa. The only major portions where SR 87 technically exists wholly inside Mesa city limits (under ADOT ownership) is the area surrounding US 60 and then a short length south of the Loop 202 Red Mountain Freeway north of McKellips Rd.

SR 87 is known as the Beeline Highway from McDowell Road, just north of Mesa, passing by Fountain Hills and to Payson. This portion of SR 87 is entirely a four-lane highway. There is a stretch of road where the highway splits, taking different canyons through the Mazatzal Mountains south of Payson, near the junction with  SR 188.  The old alignment is currently the southbound lanes, while a new alignment was built for the northbound lanes.  There is a stretch where the roads cross-over each other because of the difference in elevations of the two canyons.

SR 87 is part of the National Highway System between I-10 and Payson. ADOT is currently studying a stretch of I-10 to widen and improve interchanges along its stretch from Tucson to Casa Grande, including the interchange with SR 87.

History

SR 87 was designated in 1924 from Casa Grande to Mesa. In 1927, it was rerouted to end in Eloy, and the old route was renumbered AZ 187. In 1959, it extended to Strawberry Junction. In 1967, it extended north over State Route 65 to its current terminus. By 1983, almost half of the Beeline Highway, between Mesa and Payson, had already been widened to either three or four lanes; in 1989, work began to convert the entire highway to four lanes, and was completed in 2001.

Notable destinations along SR 87 include the Mogollon Rim and Tonto Natural Bridge.

Gallery

Major intersections

References

External links

SR 87 at Arizona Roads

087
1087
Transportation in Chandler, Arizona
Transportation in Pinal County, Arizona
Transportation in Maricopa County, Arizona
Transportation in Gila County, Arizona
Transportation in Coconino County, Arizona
Transportation in Navajo County, Arizona